International Cricket is a board game published in 1985 by Lambourne Games.

Contents
International Cricket is a game in which cricket is simulated.

Reception
Brian Walker reviewed International Cricket for Games International magazine, and gave it 4 stars out of 5, and stated that "This really is a game for cricket fans rather than gamers per se. If you fall into both categories then its acquisition is a must."

References

Board games introduced in 1985